The discography of American rock band Band of Horses consists of six studio albums, one live album, two extended plays (EPs), and 14 singles. Formed in 2004 in Seattle by Ben Bridwell, their self-released Tour EP (2005) was made available at shows and at Sub Pop's website. The band's debut full-length album, Everything All the Time, followed in 2006 and reached the charts in Norway and Sweden. Their second album, Cease to Begin was released in 2007 and charted at number 35 on the US Billboard 200. "Is There a Ghost", the first single from the album, peaked at number 34 on the US Alternative Songs chart and number 30 in Denmark.

Band of Horses' third album, Infinite Arms (2010), was their most commercially successful yet, debuting at number 7 on the Billboard 200 and number 21 on the UK Albums Chart. It featured the single "Laredo", which entered the US Alternative Songs and Rock Songs charts. The band released their fourth album, Mirage Rock, in 2012, and their first live album, Acoustic at the Ryman, in 2014.

Albums

Studio albums

Live albums

Extended plays

Singles

As lead artist

Split singles

Other appearances

Notes

References

Rock music group discographies
Discographies of American artists